Cristian Măcelaru (born 15 March 1980, Timișoara, Romania) is a Romanian conductor.

Biography
Măcelaru is the youngest child from a family of 10 children.  He studied violin in his youth.  He continued his music studies in the United States at the Interlochen Arts Academy.  He graduated from the University of Miami in 2003 with a B.M. degree. He was concertmaster of the Miami Symphony Orchestra, the youngest concertmaster in the orchestra's history.

Măcelaru further continued his music studies at Rice University, where he developed his interest in conducting.  His mentors included Larry Rachleff.  Additionally, while at Rice, he conducted the Houston Youth Orchestra,  and was a violinist with the Houston Symphony Orchestra for two seasons.  He also took master classes in conducting with such mentors as David Zinman, Rafael Frühbeck de Burgos, Oliver Knussen and Stefan Asbury, at the Tanglewood Music Festival and at the Aspen Music Festival.  From the Solti Foundation, he received its Emerging Conductor Award in 2012, and the Solti Conducting Award in 2014.

In 2011, Măcelaru became assistant conductor of The Philadelphia Orchestra.  He was promoted to associate conductor of the orchestra in 2012, and held this post until 2014.  He then served as conductor-in-residence with the orchestra from 2014 to 2017.  Măcelaru has been music director of the Cabrillo Festival of Contemporary Music since 2017.

In February 2017, Măcelaru first guest-conducted the WDR Symphony Orchestra Cologne.  He has since returned for three subsequent guest appearances with the orchestra.  In May 2018, the orchestra announced the appointment of Măcelaru as its next chief conductor, effective with the 2019-2020 season, with an initial contract of 3 years.  This appointment marks his first full-time orchestral post.  In June 2020, the orchestra announced an extension of his contract through July 2025.  In September 2018, he first guest-conducted the Orchestre National de France (ONF), and returned for a second guest-conducting appearance in the summer of 2019.  On the basis of these appearances, in November 2019, the ONF announced the appointment of Măcelaru as its next music director, effective 1 September 2021, with an initial contract of 4 years.  Following the resignation of Emmanuel Krivine as ONF music director in May 2020, Măcelaru became music director of the ONF on 1 September 2020, one year earlier than originally scheduled. In September 2022, the ONF announced an extension to Măcelaru's contract through 2027.

Măcelaru and his wife Cheryl, a bassoonist, have 2 children; they reside in Paris.

Recordings
Camille Saint-Saëns, Complete symphonies, Orchestre National de France. 3 CD Warner Classics 2021

References

External links
 Official homepage of Cristian Măcelaru
 Askonas Holt agency biography of Cristian Măcelaru
 "Cristian Macelaru B.M. '03".  Frost School of Music, University of Miami

 

 

Romanian conductors (music)
Male conductors (music)
1980 births
Living people
Rice University alumni
Musicians from Timișoara
21st-century conductors (music)
21st-century Romanian musicians
21st-century male musicians